Trichuriella is a genus of flowering plants belonging to the family Amaranthaceae.

Its native range is India Subcontinent to Indo-China, Hainan.

Species:
 Trichuriella monsoniae (L.f.) Bennet

References

Amaranthaceae
Amaranthaceae genera